Ralph Hunt may refer to:
Ralph Hunt (footballer) (1933–1964), English footballer
Ralph Hunt (MP) (died c.1432), MP for Bath
Ralph Hunt (colonist) (born 1613), founding colonist of what is today Long Island
Ralph Hunt (Australian politician) (1928–2011), Australian politician